Ariel Merari (born 1939) is a retired Israeli professor and terrorism expert.

Biography
He received a B.A. degree in psychology and in economics from Hebrew University in Jerusalem, and a Ph.D. in psychology from University of California, Berkeley. He taught at Tel Aviv University from 1975 to 2006.

On 1 December 1989 he appeared on the celebrated British television programme After Dark to discuss terrorism, alongside Fred Holroyd, Richard Clutterbuck, Jillian Becker, Gordon Liddy, Yehudi Menuhin and others.

References

Books 

 Elad, S. and Merari, A. The Soviet Bloc and World Terrorism. Tel Aviv University: The Jaffee Center for Strategic Studies Paper No. 26, 1984 (81 pp.). Also published in Hebrew in: J. Alpher (ed.) Strategic Annual 1986. Tel Aviv: Hakibutz Hameukhad, 1986, pp. 154-213.
 Merari, A. and Elad, S. The International Dimension of Palestinian Terrorism . Boulder, Colorado: Westview Press, 1987 (147 pp.)
 Published in Hebrew by: Ariel Merari, Shlomi Elad. Abroad: Foreign Palestinian Terrorism 1986-1968. Bnei Brak: United Kibbutz Publishers, 1986.

 Merari, A. Driven to Death: Psychological and Social Aspects of Suicide Terrorism. New York: Oxford University Press, 2010 (315 pp.).
 Merari, A. (Ed.). On Terrorism and Combating Terrorism. Frederick, Maryland: University Publications of America, 1985.

External links 
 Ariel Merari biography

Israeli Jews
Living people
1939 births
Experts on terrorism
Hebrew University of Jerusalem alumni
University of California, Berkeley alumni

Academic staff of Tel Aviv University